Jarmila Chalupová was a Czech Olympic fencer. She competed in the women's foil event at the 1928 Summer Olympics.

Chalupová married American Jerry Francis Vokral and emigrated to the US in the 1930s. She represented a club in Philadelphia and became a US citizen in 1936.

References

External links
 

1903 births
1988 deaths
Czech female foil fencers
Czechoslovak female foil fencers
Olympic fencers of Czechoslovakia
Fencers at the 1928 Summer Olympics